Lee Jackson Field may refer to:
 FirstEnergy Stadium-Cub Cadet Field, a college soccer venue at the University of Akron formerly known as Lee R. Jackson Soccer Field
 Lee R. Jackson Baseball Field, a college baseball venue at the University of Akron